Baldwin City is a city in Douglas County, Kansas, United States, about  south of Lawrence.  As of the 2020 census, the population of the city was 4,826.  The city is home to Baker University, the state's oldest four-year university.

History

Early history
Baldwin City began as a trail stop on the Santa Fe Trail named Palmyra.  The small community consisted of a harness shop, blacksmith, hotel, lawyer, drug store, two doctors and a tavern.  In 1858, a group of Methodist ministers gathered at Kibbee Cabin and founded Baker University.  Palmyra bought land to the south for the university and surrounding city.  The first post office was established in June, 1857.

A main benefactor of the community was John Baldwin and the town was named in his honor. Baldwin built a saw mill which was at present-day Fifth and Indiana Streets.  Baldwin City was incorporated on September 22, 1870.

Baldwin City unwittingly found themselves surrounded by the events that led up to the American Civil War. Three miles east of Baldwin was the town site of Black Jack where the Battle of Black Jack took place on June 2, 1856. The night before that battle, John Brown stayed in Prairie City. In 1863, Quantrill's raiders passed within three miles (5 km) of Baldwin after the burning of Lawrence.

Midland Railway
In 1867, the Leavenworth, Lawrence and Galveston Railroad laid tracks and became the first Kansas railroad south of the Kansas River. In 1906, the Santa Fe Depot was built and today the Midland Railway offers over 20-mile round trip excursion rides to Ottawa via "Nowhere" and Norwood. Midland's Scout program is one of the few in the country to offer a railroading merit badge and Midland has hosted a Thomas the Tank Engine attraction the last few years.

Maple Leaf Festival
Every year since 1957, Baldwin City has hosted the Maple Leaf Festival during the third full weekend in October.  It began as a way to celebrate a successful harvest and to view the fall foliage.  Today, it is the largest fall family event in the area and features a parade, arts and crafts, quilt show, theatrical performances, history tours, train rides and live music.  Annually it draws crowds of 30,000 or more.

Geography
Baldwin City is located at  (38.777597, -95.187418).

Climate
The area's climate is characterized by hot, humid summers and generally cool to cold winters. According to the Köppen Climate Classification system, Baldwin City has a humid subtropical climate, abbreviated "Cfa" on climate maps.

Demographics

Baldwin City is part of the Lawrence Metropolitan Statistical Area.

2010 census
As of the census of 2010, there were 4,515 people, 1,501 households, and 1,011 families living in the city. The racial makeup of the city was 93.4% White, 2.1% African American, 0.7% Native American, 0.5% Asian, 0.6% from other races, and 2.7% from two or more races. Hispanic or Latino of any race were 3.0% of the population.

There were 1,501 households, of which 37.5% had children under the age of 18 living with them, 52.6% were married couples living together, 10.2% had a female householder with no husband present, 4.5% had a male householder with no wife present, and 32.6% were non-families. 26.8% of all households were made up of individuals, and 12.1% had someone living alone who was 65 years of age or older. The average household size was 2.54 and the average family size was 3.08.

The median age in the city was 30.2 years. 24.3% of residents were under the age of 18; 20.9% were between the ages of 18 and 24; 22.9% were from 25 to 44; 20.1% were from 45 to 64; and 11.9% were 65 years of age or older. The gender makeup of the city was 48.5% male and 51.5% female.

2000 census
As of the census of 2000, there were 3,400 people, 1,077 households, and 774 families living in the city. The racial makeup of the city was 93.62% White, 1.12% African American, 0.74% Native American, 0.62% Asian, 0.06% Pacific Islander, 0.38% from other races, and 3.47% from two or more races. Hispanic or Latino of any race were 1.62% of the population.

There were 1,077 households, out of which 39.6% had children under the age of 18 living with them, 57.8% were married couples living together, 10.4% had a female householder with no husband present, and 28.1% were non-families. 24.8% of all households were made up of individuals, and 10.0% had someone living alone who was 65 years of age or older. The average household size was 2.59 and the average family size was 3.10.

In the city, the population was spread out, with 25.3% under the age of 18, 21.8% from 18 to 24, 24.2% from 25 to 44, 17.4% from 45 to 64, and 11.2% who were 65 years of age or older. The median age was 28 years. For every 100 females, there were 97.7 males. For every 100 females age 18 and over, there were 90.5 males.

The median income for a household in the city was $43,269, and the median income for a family was $51,667. Males had a median income of $37,111 versus $25,850 for females. The per capita income for the city was $16,698. About 5.6% of families and 7.6% of the population were below the poverty line, including 11.0% of those under age 18 and 5.7% of those age 65 or over.

Government
The Baldwin City government consists of a mayor and five council members. The council meets the first and third Tuesdays of each month at 7:00pm.
 City Hall, 803 Eighth Street.

Education

Primary and secondary education
The USD 348 School District in Baldwin City and serves most of southern Douglas County. It maintains four schools in Baldwin City (Baldwin Elementary, Baldwin Intermediate, Baldwin Junior High and Baldwin High School). On December 13, 2010, the  Board of Education voted to close the schools in Vinland and Worden at the end of the 2010–2011 school year.
Baldwin High School is home to the Bulldogs.

College
Baldwin City is home to the main campus of Baker University, a liberal arts university founded in 1858 by United Methodist ministers.  It is the oldest four-year university in Kansas and has been coed since it was founded.

Notable people

Gallery

See also
 Santa Fe Trail

References

Further reading

 A Self-Guided Tour of Baldwin City's Historic Sites on the Santa Fe Trail by Loren K. Litteer
 The Leavenworth, Lawrence & Ft. Gibson Railroad by Loren K. Litteer

External links

City
 City website
 Baldwin City - Directory of Public Officials
Schools
 USD 348, local school district
Historical
 Santa Fe Trail Research
Local Media
 Baldwin City Radio
 Baldwin City Gazette
Maps
 Baldwin city map, KDOT

Cities in Kansas
Cities in Douglas County, Kansas
Santa Fe Trail